The 1972 Louisiana Tech Bulldogs football team was an American football team that represented Louisiana Tech University as a member of the Southland Conference during the 1972 NCAA College Division football season. In their sixth year under head coach Maxie Lambright, the team compiled a 12–0 record, were National Football Foundation College Division national champion, NCAA College Division Mideast Region champion, Southland Conference champion, and defeated  in the Grantland Rice Bowl.

Schedule

References

Louisiana Tech
College football undefeated seasons
Louisiana Tech Bulldogs football seasons
Southland Conference football champion seasons
Grantland Rice Bowl champion seasons
Louisiana Tech Bulldogs football